Linda Toorop (born 12 September 1955) is a Dutch gymnast. She competed at the 1972 Summer Olympics.

References

External links
 

1955 births
Living people
Dutch female artistic gymnasts
Olympic gymnasts of the Netherlands
Gymnasts at the 1972 Summer Olympics
People from Sorong